Sad Song may refer to different pieces of music:
"Sad Song" (Blake Lewis song) by Blake Lewis on the 2009 album Heartbreak on Vinyl
"Sad Song" (The Cars song) from the 2011 album Move Like This by the Cars
"Sad Songs (Say So Much)" by Elton John on the 1984 album Breaking Hearts
"Sad Song" by Lou Reed on the 1973 album Berlin
"Sad Song" by Paul Williams on the 1974 album A Little Bit of Love
"Sad Song" by Screaming Jets on the 1994 album The Screaming Jets
"Sad Song" by David Byrne on the 1994 album David Byrne
"Sad Song" by Oasis from vinyl and Japanese editions of their 1994 album Definitely Maybe
"Sad Song" by Krayzie Bone on the 1999	album Thug Mentality 1999
"Sad Song" by Cat Power on the 2004 album Speaking for Trees
"Sad Song" by Au Revoir Simone on the 2007 album The Bird of Music
"Sad Song" by September on the 2007 album Dancing Shoes
"Sad Song" by Christina Perri from her 2011 debut album, lovestrong. 
"Sad Song" by We the Kings on the 2013 album Somewhere Somehow
"Fa-Fa-Fa-Fa-Fa (Sad Song)" by Otis Redding (1966)